Andre Allen (born February 28, 1971) is a former Canadian football offensive lineman who played five games for the Las Vegas Posse of the Canadian Football League in 1994. He played college football for the Jacksonville State Gamecocks.

References 

1971 births
Living people
Sportspeople from Anniston, Alabama
American football offensive linemen
Canadian football offensive linemen
Jacksonville State Gamecocks football players
Las Vegas Posse players
Players of American football from Alabama
Players of Canadian football from Alabama